Yang Huaiqing (February 1939 – 12 December 2012) was an admiral in the People's Liberation Army Navy (PLA Navy) of China. He was a member of the 15th and 16th Central Committees of the Chinese Communist Party. He was a delegate to the 8th National People's Congress.

Biography
Yang was born in Shouguang County (now Shouguang), Shandong, in February 1939. He enlisted in the People's Liberation Army (PLA) in January 1958, and joined the Chinese Communist Party (CCP) in May 1960. He was assigned to the East Sea Fleet in August 1970. He moved up the ranks to become deputy head of Cadre Division of the Political Department in September 1981 and head in June 1983. He served as deputy director of the PLA Navy Political Department in June 1990, and two years later promoted to the director position. He was promoted to deputy political commissar of the PLA Navy in December 1993. In July 1995, he was promoted again to become political commissar. He was removed from public office and forced into retirement alongside Shi Yunsheng in May 2003 due to the military disaster of Chinese submarine 361. He died of an illness in Beijing, at the age of 73.

He attained the rank of rear admiral (shaojiang) in July 1990, vice admiral (zhongjiang) in July 1994, and admiral (shangjiang) in June 2000.

References

1939 births
2012 deaths
People from Shouguang
PLA National Defence University alumni
Central Party School of the Chinese Communist Party alumni
People's Liberation Army generals from Shandong
People's Republic of China politicians from Shandong
Chinese Communist Party politicians from Shandong
Members of the 15th Central Committee of the Chinese Communist Party
Members of the 16th Central Committee of the Chinese Communist Party
Delegates to the 8th National People's Congress